The Centre for Analysis of Social Exclusion (CASE) is a British research centre at the Suntory and Toyota International Centres for Economic and Related Disciplines at the London School of Economics.

External links
The Guardian, Wednesday February 21, 2007 - An equitable answer? - Social policy professor John Hills has been wrestling with how we can better use existing social housing to help the most vulnerable make the most of their lives. Alison Benjamin takes him to task on his findings

London School of Economics
1997 establishments in England